Stergios Liberis (real name: Stergios Kateloglou, ; born 14 December 1984), known as or Stergio, is a Greek singer, actor, performer and activist.

Biography
He was born and raised in Athens, Greece. Stergios is well known about his successful sold-out Greek live shows in Greece and in many other countries. In addition of his music career, Stergios is noted for his humanitarian efforts, for which he has received an honorary damehood of the Order of St Michael and St George (DCMG), among other honors. He promotes various causes, including conservation, education, and is most noted for his advocacy on behalf of refugees as a Special Envoy for the United Nations High Commissioner for Refugees (UNHCR). Turkey, Russia, UAE and other Arab countries.

His first English single, "So Hot", was published by the Romanian label Roton on 14 February 2012 after his first signing contract with the label for five years.

The song was included in eight compilations worldwide with countries including Russia, Italy, Albania and Romania.

He studied acting and directing at RADA (Royal Academy of Dramatic Art) in London, UK, in 2010, and perfumer at Grasse, Institute of Perfumery in France. In December 2015 he released his debut Greek Single titled "Simera Horizo", which was released by the Greek label The Spicy Effect and is included in seven compilations as he reached at number 2 of top ten in 19 radio stations all over Greece.

in June 2016 he released a new English - Arabic single titled "Yalla Habibi Sagapo". He later released a Spanish version of the same song titled "Baila Conmigo Mi amor", which the release was made exclusive in all Lebanese radio stations and in one week was on the top of the charts on six radio stations. Stergios with his management team moved to the city of Lebanon for limited time, which he made a lot of successful and sold out live shows.

Record Labels : (Romania), Avrupa Muzik (Turkey), The Spicy Effect (Greece)

References

External links
 http://www.efhmerides.info/greek-hero-stergio-liberis-saves-syrian-refugees/
 https://www.happytv.gr/pios-ine-o-ellinas-tragoudistis-pou-kani-thrafsi-sto-livano/
 https://www.elfann.com/news/show/1173673/%D8%A7%D9%84%D9%8A%D9%88%D9%86%D8%A7%D9%86%D9%8A%C2%A0%D8%B3%D9%8A%D8%B1%D8%AC%D9%8A%D9%88-%D9%84%D9%8A%D8%A8%D8%B1%D9%8A%D8%B3-%D9%8A%D8%B7%D9%84%D9%82-%D8%AA%D9%8A%D8%B2%D8%B1-%D9%83%D9%84%D9%8A%D8%A8-%D8%A3%D8%BA%D9%86%D9%8A%D8%AA%D9%87-%D8%A8%D8%AA%D9%88%D9%82%D9%8A
 https://www.elfann.com/news/show/1179799/%D8%B3%D9%8A%D8%B1%D8%AC%D9%8A%D9%88-%D9%84%D9%8A%D8%A8%D8%B1%D9%8A%D8%B3-%D9%84%D9%84%D9%81%D9%86:-%D9%86%D8%A7%D9%86%D8%B3%D9%8A-%D8%B9%D8%AC%D8%B1%D9%85-%D8%A7%D9%84%D9%85%D9%81%D8%B6%D9%84%D8%A9-%D9%84%D8%AF%D9%8A-%D9%88%D8%A7%D9%84%D9%84%D8%A8%D9%86%D8%A7
 https://www.elfann.com/news/show/1168152/%D8%B3%D9%8A%D8%B1%D8%AC%D9%8A%D9%88-%D9%84%D9%8A%D8%A8%D8%B1%D9%8A%D8%B3-%D9%8A%D8%B5%D9%88%D9%91%D8%B1-%D9%83%D9%84%D9%8A%D8%A8%D8%A7%D9%8B-%D8%B9%D8%A7%D9%84%D9%85%D9%8A%D8%A7%D9%8B-%D9%84%D8%A8%D9%86%D8%A7%D9%86-%D9%88%D9%8A%D9%82%D9%88%D9%84:-%D8%A3%D8%A8
 http://radiomelodia.gr/stergios-limperis-simera-chorizo/
 https://tidal.com/browse/artist/7486126

21st-century Greek male singers
1984 births
Living people
Alumni of RADA
People from Athens